This is a list of blue plaques erected by the Royal Society of Chemistry.

Chemical Landmark Scheme

The Chemical Landmark Scheme (CLS) is a Royal Society of Chemistry initiative recognising sites where the chemical sciences have made a significant contribution to health, wealth, or quality of life. The blue plaques are publicly visible, and are intended to give everyone an insight into chemistry's relevance to everyday lives. CLS plaques for the first few years of the scheme (begun in 2001) were rectangular, black lettering on a steel background, but later plaques are hexagonal, white lettering on a blue background. Round plaques bearing RSC attribution do not bear the word "landmark" and are apparently without the scheme.  The scheme was suspended in mid-2018 or earlier.  As of mid-August 2021, the RSC promise to provide a formal nomination process for new plaques "shortly".

A list of plaques awarded to date can be found below.

Recently (as of mid-August 2021) the RSC have listed plaques on their own website.  Currently that list omits the 2015 plaque for Robert Angus Smith below, but has the following additional plaques:  four awarded later than the two 2016 plaques listed here, an extra 2006 plaque to Perkin, and a 1997 plaque relating to histamine H2-receptor antagonists.  The RSC list has no inscriptions or photographs in contrast to this list, but it does have the precise date of the plaque award (whereas this list gives an approximate date of installation, normally some time after the award ceremony).

England

Scotland

Northern Ireland

Wales

International

Other

References

External links 
 Places of Chemistry
 Royal Society of Chemistry plaques on OpenPlaques

History of science and technology in the United Kingdom
Royal Society of Chemistry
Royal Society of Chemistry